Topaze is a 1936 French comedy film directed by Marcel Pagnol and starring Alexandre Arnaudy, Sylvia Bataille and Pierre Asso. It is based on the Pagnol's own 1928 play Topaze. A separate adaptation Topaze had been directed by Louis J. Gasnier three years earlier.

Cast
 Arnaudy as Topaze
 Sylvia Bataille as Ernestine Muche
 Pierre Asso as Tamise
 Jean Arbuleau as Roger de Berville
 Léon Belières as Régis de Castel-Bénac
 Henri Poupon as le vieillard
 Alida Rouffe as la baronne de Pitart-Vergnolles
 Délia Col as Suzy Courtois
 Jean Castan as un élève
 Paul Demange
 Léon Brouzet as M. Muche
 André Pollack

References

Bibliography
 Goble, Alan. The Complete Index to Literary Sources in Film. Walter de Gruyter, 1999.

External links 
 

1936 films
French comedy films
1930s French-language films
1936 comedy films
Films directed by Marcel Pagnol
Films set in France
French films based on plays
Films based on works by Marcel Pagnol
French black-and-white films
1930s French films